The Ord River floodplain is the floodplain of the lower Ord River in the Shire of Wyndham-East Kimberley, in the Kimberley region of northern Western Australia. It lies within the Victoria Bonaparte IBRA bioregion and contains river, seasonal creek, tidal mudflat and floodplain wetlands, with extensive stands of mangroves, that support saltwater crocodiles and many waterbirds.

Description
It comprises the Ord River and Parry Lagoons nature reserves, with some additional land. It lies downstream of two large impoundments on the Ord River, Lakes Argyle and Kununurra, which have had a major impact on the river's hydrology through changing its flow pattern so that there are now constant flows through the dry season. In effect, the lower Ord has been transformed through flow regulation at the dams from a ‘dry tropics’ to a ‘wet tropics’ river.

The southern part of the site is dominated by Parry Creek, including  of seasonal creek and an alluvial floodplain which is flooded during the wet season.   It dries out quickly in the dry season, except for waterholes associated with incised channels and claypans.  The southern, or upstream, part of the floodplain is freshwater, while the northern, or downstream part, is either regularly flooded with saltwater or contains saline soils.

The lower reaches of the Ord River extend from the Parry Creek floodplain northwards to the Cambridge Gulf. From the mouth of the Ord River, the site extends northwards around the coast to include the False mouths of the Ord, consisting of a maze of deltaic channels, intertidal mudflats and low muddy islands, an area which receives only a little fresh water from small and ephemeral creeks.

Climate
The site has a dry tropical climate. Rainfall is monsoonal, with the hot and humid wet season occurring from November to March. The dry season is mild, with periods of steady south-easterly winds.

Flora and fauna

Vegetation
Within the site ten main vegetation associations have been identified: mudflats, mangroves, dune systems, grassland, low woodland, sandstone range open woodland, riverine woodland, rainforest (aquifer forest) and spring vegetation, major rivers and lagoons (permanent and ephemeral), and savanna woodland. Some 335 native vascular plants from 89 families have been recorded from the site, with 16 introduced species.

The eastern coast of the Cambridge Gulf is one of the richest places for mangroves in the Kimberley region in terms of species diversity, structural complexity, and area, with 14 species occurring within the site. Sporobolus virginicus grassland and samphire grow on the mudflats behind the mangroves. Other occasional species of mangrove include Xylocarpus moluccensis, Excoecaria agallocha and Camptostemon schultzii.

Birds
The seasonal wetlands on the floodplain regularly support large numbers of waterbirds.  Numerically important duck species include hardhead, grey teal and plumed whistling duck.  The lagoons are also an important site for shorebirds: several thousand little curlews and Oriental pratincoles, and hundreds of wood sandpipers have been counted.  The Parry Lagoons are probably the most important site in Australia for both wood and marsh sandpipers.  When local rainfall is high the lagoons and other seasonal wetlands are major breeding areas for waterbirds in the Kimberley, with up to 77 species recorded in habitats associated with Parry Creek.   The grasslands are the only place in Western Australia where zitting cisticolas occur naturally. The mangroves contain 12 of the 13 species of terrestrial bird restricted to such habitat, or to rainforest, in Western Australia, including the black butcherbird.  About 200 bird species have been recorded from the site.

Other fauna
The lower Ord River contains a high density of salt water crocodiles. The mangroves support at least six species of microbat, the black flying-fox and grassland melomys.  Other mammals known from the site include: the northern nail-tail wallaby, agile wallaby, long-haired rat and Kimberley rock rat.  The critically endangered largetooth sawfish has been collected from the lower Ord River.

Human activity
Aboriginal people have a complex and spiritual relationship with the land and waters of the Ord River.  The site lies within the traditional lands of the Miriuwung and Gajerrong language groups, and there are many cultural heritage sites, including those concerned with ceremonial, mythological and burial activities, associated with the river.

The area is a regular tourist destination.  Some exploration for alluvial diamonds takes place. The surrounding land is used for cattle grazing.

References

Notes

Sources
 
 
 

Ramsar sites in Australia
Protected areas of Western Australia
Floodplains of Australia
Ord River
Kimberley tropical savanna